Kyle Daniel Tudge (born 19 March 1987 in Newport, Monmouthshire) is a Welsh cricketer. He is a right-handed batsman and a slow left-handed bowler who formerly played for Glamorgan.

He entered first-class cricket for the first time in August 2006, making his debut courtesy of a knee injury to team-mate Dean Cosker, as the spin bowler made the step up from Second XI cricket to the first XI, making 3/27 on a steady debut.

Tudge, also played for Wales Minor Counties, and appeared consistently for the Second XI since having been given a chance to perform for the first time halfway through 2005. Tudge is a lower-order batsman for the Glamorgan Second XI.

Glamorgan declined to renew his contract after the 2008 Season, and Tudge currently turns out for his local club side.

External links
Kyle Tudge at CricketArchive 

1987 births
Welsh cricketers
Living people
Glamorgan cricketers
People educated at Monmouth School for Boys
Wales National County cricketers